TwinsDntBeg.jpg
Emmanuel and Samuel Appiah Gyan (born 3 April 1989), known professionally as Twins don't beg, stylised as Twinsdntbeg, are twin photographers in Ghana. The duo began photography in 2015 and have worked with celebrities and figures both locally and internationally. They are the official photographers of the Second Lady of Ghana, Samira Bawumia.

Early life and education 
Emmanuel and Samuel Appiah Gyan were born on 3 April 1989. They studied agriculture with a major in Post-Harvest Technology and Landscape Management and Architecture, respectively at the Kwame Nkrumah University of Science and Technology (KNUST), Kumasi, Ghana.

Career 
The duo began their professional photography in 2015. They have worked with Ghanaian personalities like President of the Republic of Ghana, Nana Akufo Addo, Becca, Akosua Vee, Efya, DKB, Jackie Appiah, Stonebwoy and Nana Ama McBrown. They were the official photographers for the Nairobi Entrepreneur Fashion week. They are brand ambassadors for Sultan drink. They were the main photographers for the Ghana Music Awards 2017, Ghana Meets Naija and Miss Malaika 2017 pageant.

Honours and awards 

 Winners of Best nightlife Photographers of the year at the Ghana Nightlife Awards.
 Most Influential Young Ghanaians in the Life Style Category of the Avance Media 50 Most Influential Young Ghanaians Awards 2018.
Represented Ghana at the 51st NAACP Image Awards in California.

References 

Ghanaian photographers
Ghanaian twins
Living people
Male twins
1989 births